Enzo Robutti (24 October 1933 – 13 February 2022) was an Italian actor, voice actor, comedian, playwright, and writer.

Life and career 
Born in Bologna, Robutti attended the drama school of the Piccolo Teatro in Milan, and debuted on stage in the theatrical company of Vittorio Gassman in Irma la dolce. He got his early successes as a stand-up comedian and a cabaret author at the Derby Club in Milan. Robutti was also very active as a character film actor, often cast in comedies in roles of hysterical, chorelical characters.  He often worked with Pasquale Festa Campanile.

Selected filmography

 Outlaws of Love (1963)
 Il profeta (1968) - Alberto
 Sardinia Kidnapped (1968)
 Fermate il mondo... voglio scendere! (1970) - Martora
 La torta in cielo (1970)
 Il merlo maschio (1971)
 Without Family (1972) - Malato
 The Hassled Hooker (1972) - Manca - Turrisi assistant in Rome
 Decameron nº 3 - Le più belle donne del Boccaccio (1972) - The Jealous Husband (segment "The Jealous Husband")
 Beati i ricchi (1972) - Direttore di banca
 Jus primae noctis (1972) 
 Il generale dorme in piedi (1972) - Ten. Psichiatra Mancini
 Rugantino  (1973) - Scultore
 Non ho tempo (1973) - Esaminatore
 La signora è stata violentata! (1973) - Il professore
 L'ultimo uomo di Sara (1974) - Commesso viaggiatore
 Poker in Bed (1974) - Primo Guendalini - l'antiquario
 Amore mio, non farmi male (1974) - Laganà - colleague of Paolo
 Il lumacone (1974) - Un cliente
 Conviene far bene l'amore (1975) - Matteis
 Down the Ancient Staircase (1975)
 Son tornate a fiorire le rose (1975) - Laganà - colleague of Paolo
 Dog's Heart (1976) - Il commissario
 Tell Me You Do Everything for Me (1976) - Felegatti
 Sturmtruppen  (1976) - Lo psichiatra
 Puttana galera! (1976)
 Plot of Fear (1976) - Client with unfaithful wife
 Carioca tigre (1976) - Baltazar
 Che notte quella notte! (1977) - Giovane intellettuale
 The American Friend (1977) - Falling man (uncredited)
 L'occhio dietro la parete (1977)
 Wifemistress (1977) - Priest
 Grand hôtel des palmes (1977)
 L'anello matrimoniale (1977) - Shop keeper
 Il cappotto di Astrakan (1979) - Ramazzini
 Il ritorno di Casanova (1980)
 Il ladrone (1980) - Centurion
 Qua la mano (1980) - Benigno - friend of Fulgenzio
 La locanda della maladolescenza (1980)
 Sugar, Honey and Pepper (1980) - Commissario Milanese
 Mia moglie torna a scuola (1981) - Prof. Pier Capponi
 Pierino contro tutti (1981) - Il negoziante
 I carabbimatti (1981) - S.S.
 Forest of Love (1981)
 Pierino la peste alla riscossa! (1982) - Cliente della farmacia
 Il paramedico (1982) - Police Chief
 Pierino colpisce ancora (1982) - Professor Pomari
 Scusa se è poco (1982) - Ferrini
 Porca vacca (1982) - Capitano
 Bingo Bongo (1982) - Dr. Muller
 Gian Burrasca (1982) - Stanislao 'Calpurnio'
 Petomaniac (1983) - Giudice Istruttore
 A Proper Scandal (1984) - Director of the Asylum
 Mamma Ebe (1985) - Il vescovo
 45º parallelo (1986)
 The Rogues (1987) - Capitano della nave
 Fratello dello spazio (1988)
 The Godfather Part III (1990) - Don Licio Lucchesi
 La cattedra (1991) 
 Viola Kisses Everybody (1998) - Giotto
 Cucciolo (1998)
 Incontri proibiti (1988) - Federica's father

References

External links
 

1933 births
2022 deaths
Actors from Bologna
Italian male film actors
20th-century Italian male actors
Italian male stage actors
Italian male television actors
Italian stand-up comedians
Italian male dramatists and playwrights